Bridgend Flats is an area of mudflats and saltmarsh near the village of Bridgend on the island of Islay off the west coast of Scotland. Covering an area of 331 hectares, it is situated around the outflow of the River Sorn into Loch Indaal.

Bridgend Flats is an important over-wintering location for the Greenland population of the barnacle goose. It has been recognised as a wetland of international importance under the Ramsar Convention, and has been designated a Site of Special Scientific Interest and Special Protection Area.

References

Ramsar sites in Scotland
Sites of Special Scientific Interest in Islay and Jura
Wetlands of Scotland